The 1987 Yonex All England Open Championships was the 77th edition held in 1987, at Wembley Arena, London.

Final results

Men's singles

Seeds

Section 1

Section 2

Women's singles

Seeds

Section 1

Section 2

References
 newspapers.nl.sg

All England Open Badminton Championships
All England Open
All England
All England Open Badminton Championships in London
All England Open Badminton Championships
All England Open Badminton Championships